Román Alí Solís López (born September 29, 1987) is a Mexican professional baseball catcher for the Sultanes de Monterrey of the Mexican League and Tomateros de Culiacán of the Mexican Pacific League. He has played in Major League Baseball (MLB) for the San Diego Padres in 2012 and Tampa Bay Rays in 2014.

Professional career

San Diego Padres
The San Diego Padres signed Solís as an international free agent in February 2005. Solís spent eight professional seasons in the Padres minor league organization, as well as playing 21 games in the Mexican League in 2010.

In 2012, Solís played for the Double-A San Antonio Missions, hitting .283 with 6 home runs in 87 games. He appeared in the All-Star Futures Game as a replacement for Yasmani Grandal. He was voted the top catcher, along with Lars Davis, in the Texas League.

The Padres promoted Solís to the major leagues on September 4, 2012.  He appeared in 5 games and had 4 at-bats, staying on the roster through the end of the season.

Pittsburgh Pirates
On October 25, 2012, the Pittsburgh Pirates claimed Solís off waivers and then outrighted him to the minors.

Tampa Bay Rays
Solis signed a minor league deal with the Tampa Bay Rays on November 21, 2013. His contract was selected from the Triple-A Durham Bulls on May 27, 2014, and for the season he was hitless in six at bats.

Los Angeles Dodgers
On December 19, 2014, Solís signed a minor league contract with the Los Angeles Dodgers that included an invitation to Major League spring training. Solís left the team on February 21, 2015, due to a "contractual issue." On March 16, he rejoined the Dodgers but was assigned to minor league camp. He was assigned to the AA Tulsa Drillers to start the season. He played in 69 games for Tulsa and hit .145/.175/.195 in 220 at bats before a late season recall to the Triple-A Oklahoma City Dodgers, where he hit .143 in 14 at bats in seven games.

Boston Red Sox
On December 15, 2015, Solís signed a minor league contract with the Boston Red Sox. He split the 2016 season between the Double-A Portland Sea Dogs and the Triple-A Pawtucket Red Sox, slashing a cumulative .192/.236/.273 in 33 games for the two affiliates. On November 7, 2016, Solís elected free agency.

Chicago Cubs
On January 10, 2017, Solís signed a minor league contract with the Chicago Cubs. He was invited to Spring Training for the 2018 season but did not make the team and was assigned to the Triple-A Iowa Cubs.

Sultanes de Monterrey
On August 7, 2018, Solís was loaned to the Sultanes de Monterrey of the Mexican League. With them in 2018 he batted .366/.400/.521 in 71 at bats. Solís did not play in a game in 2020 due to the cancellation of the Mexican League season because of the COVID-19 pandemic.

International career
He was selected Mexico national baseball team at 2013 World Baseball Classic and 2019 exhibition games against Japan.

References

External links

1987 births
Living people
Altoona Curve players
Arizona League Padres players
Baseball players from Baja California
Durham Bulls players
Eugene Emeralds players
Fort Wayne TinCaps players
Fort Wayne Wizards players
Indianapolis Indians players
Iowa Cubs players
Lake Elsinore Storm players
Major League Baseball catchers
Major League Baseball players from Mexico
Mexican expatriate baseball players in the United States
Mexican League baseball catchers
Oklahoma City Dodgers players
Pawtucket Red Sox players
Portland Sea Dogs players
Sportspeople from Mexicali
San Diego Padres players
San Antonio Missions players
Sultanes de Monterrey players
Tampa Bay Rays players
Tigres de Quintana Roo players
Tomateros de Culiacán players
Tucson Padres players
Tulsa Drillers players
2013 World Baseball Classic players
Baseball players at the 2020 Summer Olympics
Olympic baseball players of Mexico